Manikam Vasagam Pillai MBE (last name sometimes spelt Pillay) was a Fiji Indian lawyer, football administrator, and politician. He was a supporter of the Alliance Party  and in the 1968 by-elections contested the Nadi Indian Communal seat against Dr A. D. Patel, the leader of the Federation Party, but lost by 7903 votes to 2772. He later served as Attorney General of Fiji from 1981 to 1984. He then became Chairman of the Fiji Law Reform Commission, serving till 1987.

Career 

Pillay was President of the Fiji Football Association from 1962 to 1965, and again from 1967 to 1983. . He opened Govind Park in July 1976.  Associates remembered him as a polite and unflappable person, who rarely spoke during negotiations, except to propose a compromise (which was usually accepted) to break a deadlock.

On 13 June 1980, Pillai was made a Member of the Order of the British Empire (M.B.E.) for his services to the community. He died in the late 1980s or early 1990s.

References

Alliance Party (Fiji) politicians
Year of death missing
Fijian Tamil politicians
Attorneys-general of Fiji
20th-century Fijian lawyers
Politicians from Nadi
Indian members of the Senate (Fiji)
Fijian civil servants
Year of birth missing
Members of the Order of the British Empire